Rassi may refer to:

People

Surname
Abdullah Rassi, Lebanese politician
Georges Al Rassi, Lebanese musician
Karim Rassi, Lebanese politician
Mazdack Rassi, Iranian entrepreneur
Nadine Al Rassi, Lebanese actress
Al-Qasim al-Rassi, Arab religious figure
Zanna Roberts Rassi, British journalist and businesswoman

Given name
Rassi Nashalik, Canadian journalist

Places
Rassi, Estonia

See also
Rassie Erasmus, South African rugby union coach and former player
Rassie van der Dussen, South African cricketer
Arabic-language surnames